Proverbs 10 is the tenth chapter of the Book of Proverbs in the Hebrew Bible or the Old Testament of the Christian Bible. The book is a compilation of several wisdom literature collections, with the heading in 1:1 may be intended to regard Solomon as the traditional author of the whole book, but the dates of the individual collections are difficult to determine, and the book probably obtained its final shape in the post-exilic period. This chapter is a part of the second collection of the book.

Text
The original text is written in Hebrew language. This chapter is divided into 32 verses.

Textual witnesses
Some early manuscripts containing the text of this chapter in Hebrew are of the Masoretic Text, which includes the Aleppo Codex (10th century), and Codex Leningradensis (1008). Fragments containing parts of this chapter in Hebrew were found among the Dead Sea Scrolls including 4Q103 (4QProv; 30 BCE – 30 CE) with extant verses 30–32.

There is also a translation into Koine Greek known as the Septuagint, made in the last few centuries BC. Extant ancient manuscripts of the Septuagint version include Codex Vaticanus (B; B; 4th century), Codex Sinaiticus (S; BHK: S; 4th century), and Codex Alexandrinus (A; A; 5th century).

Analysis
This chapter belongs to a section regarded as the second collection in the book of Proverbs (comprising Proverbs 10:1–22:16), also called "The First 'Solomonic' Collection" (the second one in Proverbs 25:1–29:27). The collection contains 375 sayings (375 is the numerical value of the Hebrew name "Solomon"), each of which consists of two parallel phrases, except for Proverbs 19:7 which consists of three parts.

Verse 1

The proverbs of Solomon.
A wise son makes a glad father,
but a foolish son is the grief of his mother.
This verse opens a new, different section, following parental appeals in chapters 1–9, with a proverb observing the effect on parents of the wisdom or folly of their child (cf. Proverbs 15:20; 17:21, 25), that not only brings the joy or sorrow of parents, but also the family's reputation (cf. Proverbs 28:7) and prosperity (cf. Proverbs 29:3).

Verse 15
The rich man's wealth is his strong city:
the destruction of the poor is their poverty.
"Strong city": that is, "fortified city"; a metaphor how wealth can protect its possessors against adversity, but only when such wealth is attained by diligence and righteous means (verse 2; cf. Proverbs 13:8; 18:11, 23; 22:7). On the other hand, the poor have no resources to fall back on, especially those who have only themselves to blame (verse 4).

See also

Related Bible parts: Proverbs 9, Proverbs 22, Proverbs 28

References

Sources

External links
 Jewish translations:
 Mishlei - Proverbs - Chapter 10 (Judaica Press) translation [with Rashi's commentary] at Chabad.org
 Christian translations:
 Online Bible at GospelHall.org (ESV, KJV, Darby, American Standard Version, Bible in Basic English)
 Book of Proverbs Chapter 10 King James Version
  Various versions

10